Pentachaeta alsinoides, the tiny pygmydaisy, is a species of flowering plant in the family Asteraceae endemic to California. It is an annual, low, slender, diffuse, somewhat villous; leaves filiform or nearly so; disk flowers reddish, ray flowers inconspicuous.

References

External links
Jepson Manual Treatment

External links
Calflora Database: Pentachaeta alsinoides (Tiny pygmy daisy)
 Jepson eFlora treatment of Pentachaeta alsinoides

Astereae
Endemic flora of California
Natural history of the California chaparral and woodlands
Natural history of the California Coast Ranges
Taxa named by Edward Lee Greene
Flora without expected TNC conservation status